The 1910s (pronounced "nineteen-tens" abbreviated as the "10s" or simply the "Tens") was a decade that began on January 1, 1910, and ended on December 31, 1919.

The 1910s represented the culmination of European militarism which had its beginnings during the second half of the 19th century. The conservative lifestyles during the first half of the decade, as well as the legacy of military alliances, were forever changed by the assassination, on June 28, 1914, of Archduke Franz Ferdinand, the heir presumptive to the Austro-Hungarian throne. The murder triggered a chain of events in which, within 33 days, World War I broke out in Europe on August 1, 1914. The conflict dragged on until a truce was declared on November 11, 1918, leading to the controversial, one-sided Treaty of Versailles, which was signed on June 28, 1919.

The war's end triggered the abdication of various monarchies and the collapse of four of the last modern empires of Russia, Germany, Ottoman Turkey and Austria-Hungary, with the latter splintered into  Austria, Hungary, southern Poland (who acquired most of their land in a war with Soviet Russia), Czechoslovakia and Yugoslavia, as well as the unification of Romania with Transylvania and Moldavia. However, each of these states (with the possible exception of Yugoslavia) had large German and Hungarian minorities, creating some unexpected problems that would be brought to light in the next two decades. (See Dissolution of Austro-Hungarian Empire: Successor states for better description of composition of names of successor countries/states following the splinter.)

The decade was also a period of revolution in many countries. The Portuguese 5 October 1910 revolution, which ended the eight-century long monarchy, spearheaded the trend, followed by the Mexican Revolution in November 1910, which led to the ousting of dictator Porfirio Diaz, developing into a violent civil war that dragged on until mid-1920, not long after a new Mexican Constitution was signed and ratified. The Russian Empire had a similar fate, since its participation in World War I led it to a social, political and economical collapse which made the tsarist autocracy unsustainable and, succeeding the events of 1905, culminated in the Russian Revolution and the establishment of the Russian Soviet Federative Socialist Republic, under the direction of the  Bolshevik Party later renamed as Communist Party of the Soviet Union. The Russian Revolution of 1918
, known as the October Revolution, was followed by the Russian Civil War, which dragged on until approximately late 1922. China saw 2,000 years of imperial rule end with the Xinhai Revolution, becoming a nominal republic until Yuan Shikai's failed attempt to restore the monarchy and his death started the Warlord Era in 1916.

Much of the music in these years was ballroom-themed. Many of the fashionable restaurants were equipped with dance floors. Prohibition in the United States began January 16, 1919, with the ratification of the Eighteenth Amendment to the U.S. Constitution. Best-selling books of this decade include The Inside of the Cup, Seventeen, Mr. Britling Sees It Through, and The Four Horsemen of the Apocalypse.

During the 1910s, the world population increased from 1.75 to 1.87 billion, with approximately 640 million births and 500 million deaths in total.

Politics and wars

Wars 
 World War I (1914–1918)
 Assassination of Archduke Franz Ferdinand of Austria-Hungary in Sarajevo leads to the outbreak of the First World War
Germany signs the Treaty of Versailles after losing the first world war.
 Armenian genocide during and just after World War I. It was characterised by the use of massacres and deportations involving forced marches under conditions designed to lead to the death of the deportees, with the total number of Armenian deaths generally held to have been between one and one-and-a-half million.
 Wadai War (1909–1911)
 Italo-Turkish War (1911–1912)
 First Balkan Wars (1912–1913) – two wars that took place in South-eastern Europe in 1912 and 1913.
 Saudi-Ottoman War (1913)
 Latvian War of Independence (1918-1920) – a military conflict in Latvia between the Republic of Latvia and the Russian SFSR.

Internal conflicts 
 October Revolution in Russia results in the overthrow of capitalism and the establishment of the world's first self-proclaimed socialist state; political upheaval in Russia culminating in the establishment of the Russian SFSR and the assassination of Emperor Nicholas II and the royal family.
 The Russian Revolution (1917) is the collective term for the series of revolutions in Russia in 1917, which destroyed the Tsarist autocracy and led to the creation of the Soviet Union. It lead to the Russian Civil War and other conflicts such as the Finnish Civil War, the Ukrainian War of Independence and the Polish–Soviet War.  
 April 13, 1919 – The Jallianwala Bagh massacre, at Amritsar in the Punjab Province of British India, sows the seeds of discontent and leads to the birth of the Indian Independence Movement.
 Xinhai Revolution causes the overthrow of China's ruling Qing dynasty, and the establishment of the Republic of China (1912-1949). The Warlord Era (1916–1928) began. 
 Mexican Revolution (1910–1920) Francisco I. Madero proclaims the elections of 1910 null and void, and calls for an armed revolution at 6 p.m. against the illegitimate presidency/dictatorship of Porfirio Díaz. The revolution lead to the ousting of Porfirio Díaz (who ruled from 1876 to 1880 and since 1884) six months later. The Revolution progressively becomes a civil war with multiple factions and phases, culminating with the Mexican Constitution of 1917, but combat would persist for three more years.

Major political changes 
 Portugal becomes the first republican country in the century after the 5 October 1910 revolution, ending its long-standing monarchy and creating the First Portuguese Republic in 1911.
 Germany abolishes its monarchy and becomes under the rule of a new elected government called the Weimar Republic.
 Seventeenth Amendment to the United States Constitution is passed, causing US senators to be directly elected rather than appointed by the state legislatures.
 Federal Reserve Act is passed by United States Congress, establishing a Central Bank in the US.
 George V becomes king in Britain.
 Dissolution of the German colonial empire, Ottoman Empire, Austria-Hungary and the Russian Empire, reorganization of European states, territorial boundaries, and the creation of several new European states and territorial entities: Austria, Czechoslovakia, Estonia, Finland, Free City of Danzig, Hungary, Latvia, Lithuania, Poland, Saar, Ukraine, and Yugoslavia.
 Fourteen Points as designed by United States President Woodrow Wilson advocates the right of all nations to self-determination.
 Rise to power of the Bolsheviks in Russia under Vladimir Lenin, creating the Russian Soviet Federated Socialist Republic, the first state committed to the establishment of communism.

Decolonization and independence 
 Easter Rising against the British in Ireland; eventually leads to Irish independence.
 Several nations in Eastern Europe get their own nation state, thereby replacing major multiethnic empires.
 The Republic of China is established on January 1, 1912.

Prominent political events

Assassinations and attempts

Prominent assassinations, targeted killings, and assassination attempts include:

 March 18, 1913: George I of Greece
 June 11, 1913: Mahmud Şevket Pasha, Grand Vizier of the Ottoman Empire
 June 28, 1914 — Archduke Franz Ferdinand of Austria-Hungary is assassinated in Sarajevo, Bosnia and Herzegovina; prompting the events that led up to the start of World War I.
 July 17, 1918: Shooting of former Russian Emperor Nicholas II, his consort, their five children, and four retainers at the Ipatiev House in Yekaterinburg, Russian Soviet Federative Socialist Republic following the October Revolution of 1917, and the usurpation of power by the Bolsheviks.
 April 10, 1919: Emiliano Zapata

Disasters

 The RMS Titanic, a British ocean liner which was the largest and most luxurious ship at that time, struck an iceberg and sank two hours and 40 minutes later in the North Atlantic during its maiden voyage on April 15, 1912. 1,517 people perished in the disaster.
 On May 29, 1914, the British ocean liner RMS Empress of Ireland collided in thick fog with the SS Storstad, a Norwegian collier, near the mouth of Saint Lawrence River in Canada, sinking in 14 minutes. 1,012 lives were lost.
 On November 21, 1916, the HMHS Britannic was holed in an explosion while passing through a channel which had been seeded with enemy mines and sank in 55 minutes.
 From 1918 through 1920, the Spanish flu killed from 17.4 to 100 million people worldwide.
 In 1916, the Netherlands was hit by a North Sea storm that flooded the lowlands and killed 19 people.
 From July 1 to July 12, 1916, a series of shark attacks, known as the Jersey Shore shark attacks of 1916, occurred along the Jersey Shore, killing four and injuring one. 
 On January 11, 1914, Sakurajima erupted which resulted in the death of 35 people. In addition, the surrounding islands were consumed, and an isthmus was created between Sakurajima and the mainland.
 In 1917, the Halifax Explosion killed 2,000 people.
 In 1919, the Great Molasses Flood in Boston, Massachusetts killed 21 people and injured 150.

Other significant international events 
 The Panama Canal is completed in 1914.
 World War I from 1914 until 1918 dominates the Western world.
 Hiram Bingham rediscovers Machu Picchu on July 24, 1911.
 Islamic movements, such as Liberal Islam and Islamic modernism, that reject orthodox beliefs to varying degrees are at their most prominent position yet.

Science and technology

Technology 

 Gideon Sundback patented the first modern zipper.
 Harry Brearley invented stainless steel.
 Charles Strite invented the first pop-up bread toaster.
 The Model T Ford dominated the automobile market, selling more than all other makers combined in 1914.
 The army tank was invented. Tanks in World War I were used by the British Army, the French Army and the German Army.
1912 - Articulated trams, invented and first used by the Boston Elevated Railway.

Science 
 In 1916, Albert Einstein's theory of general relativity.
 Max von Laue discovers the diffraction of x-rays by crystals.
 In 1912, Alfred Wegener puts forward his theory of continental drift.

Economics 
 In the years 1910 and 1911, there was a minor economic depression known as the Panic of 1910–11, which was followed by the enforcement of the Sherman Anti-Trust Act.

Popular culture 
 Flying Squadron of America promotes temperance movement in the United States.
 Edith Smith Davis edits the Temperance Educational Quarterly.
 The first U.S. feature film, Oliver Twist, was released in 1912.
 The first mob film, D. W. Griffith's The Musketeers of Pig Alley was released in 1912.
 Hollywood, California, replaces the East Coast as the center of the movie industry.
 The first crossword puzzle was published 21 December 1913 appearing in The New York World newspaper.
 The comic strip Krazy Kat begins.
 Charlie Chaplin débuts his trademark mustached, baggy-pants "Little Tramp" character in Kid Auto Races at Venice in 1914.
 The first African American owned studio, the Lincoln Motion Picture Company, was founded in 1917.
 The four Warner brothers, (from older to younger) Harry, Albert, Samuel, and Jack opened their first major film studio in Burbank in 1918.
Tarzan of the Apes starring Elmo Lincoln is released in 1918, the first Tarzan film.
 The first jazz music is recorded by the Original Dixieland Jass Band for Victor (#18255) in late February, 1917.
 The Salvation Army has a new international leader, General Bramwell Booth who served from 1912 to 1929. He replaces his father and co-founder of the Christian Mission (the forerunner of the Salvation Army), William Booth.

Sports 
 1912 Summer Olympics were held in Stockholm, Sweden.
 1916 Summer Olympics were cancelled because of World War I.

Literature and arts

Below are the best-selling books in the United States of each year, as determined by The Bookman, a New York-based literary journal (1910 - 1912) and Publishers Weekly (1913 and beyond).

 1910: The Rosary by Florence L. Barclay
 1911: The Broad Highway by Jeffery Farnol
 1912: The Harvester by Gene Stratton Porter
 1913: The Inside of the Cup by Winston Churchill
 1914: The Eyes of the World by Harold Bell Wright
 1915: The Turmoil by Booth Tarkington
 1916: Seventeen by Booth Tarkington
 1917: Mr. Britling Sees It Through by H. G. Wells
 1918: The U.P. Trail by Zane Grey
 1919: The Four Horseman of the Apocalypse by Vicente Blasco Ibáñez

Visual Arts

The 1913 Armory Show in New York City was a seminal event in the history of Modern Art. Innovative contemporaneous artists from Europe and the United States exhibited together in a massive group exhibition in New York City, and Chicago.

Art movements
Imagism

Cubism and related movements
Proto-Cubism
Crystal Cubism
Orphism
Section d'Or
Synchromism
Futurism

Expressionism and related movements
Symbolism
Blaue Reiter
Die Brücke

Geometric abstraction and related movements
Suprematism
De Stijl
Constructivism

Other movements and techniques
Surrealism
Dada
Collage

Influential artists
Pablo Picasso
Georges Braque
Henri Matisse
Jean Metzinger
Marcel Duchamp
Wassily Kandinsky
Albert Gleizes
Kasimir Malevich
Giorgio de Chirico
Robert Frost

People

Business

Arnold Rothstein, gangster, gambler, fixed the 1919 World Series
Henry Ford, industrialist, founder of the Ford Motor Company

Inventors
Nikola Tesla, electrical and mechanical engineer

Politics
 John Barrett, Director-general Organization of American States
 Georges Louis Beer, Chairman Permanent Mandates Commission
 Henry P. Davison, Chairman International Federation of Red Cross and Red Crescent Societies
 Sir James Eric Drummond, Secretary-general League of Nations
 Emil Frey, Director International Telecommunication Union
 Christian Louis Lange, Secretary-general Inter-Parliamentary Union
 Baron Louis Paul Marie Hubert Michiels van Verduynen, Secretary-general Permanent Court of Arbitration
 William E. Rappard, Secretary-general International Federation of Red Cross and Red Crescent Societies
 Manfred von Richthofen, alias the "Red Baron", fighter pilot
 Eugène Ruffy, Director Universal Postal Union
 William Napier Shaw, President World Meteorological Organization
 Albert Thomas, Director International Labour Organization
 Grigory Yevseyevich Zinoviev, Chairman of the Executive Committee Communist International

Authors
 Edgar Rice Burroughs
 James Joyce

Entertainers

Fatty Arbuckle
Theda Bara
Richard Barthelmess
Béla Bartók
Irving Berlin
Eubie Blake
Shelton Brooks
Lew Brown
Tom Brown
Anne Caldwell
Eddie Cantor
Enrico Caruso
Charlie Chaplin
Lon Chaney
George M. Cohan
Henry Creamer
Bebe Daniels
Cecil B. DeMille
Buddy De Sylva
Walter Donaldson
Marie Dressler
Eddie Edwards
Gus Edwards
Douglas Fairbanks
Fred Fisher
John Ford
Eddie Foy
George Gershwin
Beniamino Gigli
Dorothy Gish
Lillian Gish
Samuel Goldwyn
D. W. Griffith
W. C. Handy
Otto Harbach
Lorenz Hart
Victor Herbert
Harry Houdini
Charles Ives
Tony Jackson
Emil Jannings
William Jerome
Al Jolson
Gus Kahn
Gustave Kahn
Buster Keaton
Jerome David Kern
Ring Lardner
Nick LaRocca
Harry Lauder
Florence Lawrence
Ted Lewis
Harold Lloyd
Charles McCarron
Joseph McCarthy
Winsor McCay
Oscar Micheaux
Mae Murray
Alla Nazimova
Pola Negri
Anna Q. Nilsson
Ivor Novello
Alcide Nunez
Geoffrey O'Hara
Sidney Olcott
Jack Pickford
Mary Pickford
Armand J. Piron
Cole Porter
American Quartet
Richard Rodgers
Sigmund Romberg
Jean Schwartz
Mack Sennett
Larry Shields
Chris Smith
Erich von Stroheim
Arthur Sullivan
Gloria Swanson
Wilber Sweatman
Blanche Sweet
Albert Von Tilzer
Harry Von Tilzer
Musicians of the Titanic
Sophie Tucker
Pete Wendling
Pearl White
Bert Williams
Clarence Williams
Harry Williams
Spencer Williams
P. G. Wodehouse
Mabel Normand

Sports figures

Baseball

Babe Ruth, (American baseball player)
Honus Wagner, (American baseball player)
Christy Mathewson, (American baseball player)
Walter Johnson, (American baseball player)
Ty Cobb, (American baseball player)
Tris Speaker, (American baseball player)
Nap Lajoie, (American baseball player)
Eddie Collins, (American baseball player)
Mordecai Brown, (American baseball player)

Olympics

Jim Thorpe

Boxing
Jack Dempsey
Jess Willard

See also 
 1910s in literature

Timeline 
The following articles contain brief timelines which list the most prominent events of the decade:

1910 • 1911 • 1912 • 1913 • 1914 • 1915 • 1916 • 1917 • 1918 • 1919

References

Further reading

  (covers 1910–1912)

 
20th century
1910s decade overviews